FEBS Letters is a not-for-profit peer-reviewed scientific journal published on behalf of the Federation of European Biochemical Societies (FEBS) by Wiley. It covers all aspects of molecular biosciences, including molecular biology and biochemistry. The aim of the journal is to publish primary research in the form of Research Articles, Research Letters, Communications and Hypotheses, as well as secondary research in the form of Review articles. The journal also publishes a News and Views column called "The Scientists' Forum". The editorial office of FEBS Letters is based in Heidelberg, Germany. The journal income is reinvested in science.

History
The initial idea of FEBS Letters as a journal for rapid communication of short reports in biochemistry, biophysics and molecular biology was proposed by the Secretary General of FEBS, W.J. Whelan, at the 4th FEBS Meeting held in Oslo in 1967. After further discussions and preparations, the first issue of FEBS Letters appeared in July 1968 with Satya Prakash Datta acting as Managing Editor. The initial editorial policy urged the authors to submit their manuscripts directly to a member of the Editorial Board, who independently evaluated them and, if needed, consulted external referees. Apart from original research articles, early on FEBS Letters started publishing short reviews, hypotheses, discussion articles and meeting reports, as well as a number of supplements to regular issues extensively covering topical subjects. In 2000 the handling of manuscripts was centralized and the editorial process amended and standardized.

Satya Prakash Datta, who served as Managing Editor until 1985, was succeeded by Giorgio Semenza (1986-2000) and Matti Saraste (2000-2001). Between 2001 and 2021, the Managing Editor was Felix Wieland. The current Editor in Chief is Michael Brunner.

The journal published 144 articles in 1968, and from then on steadily increased its output to reach an all-time high of 1733 published articles in 1999.

Editorial and publishing concept
FEBS Letters staff consists of the Editor in Chief, the Editorial Office and the Editorial Board. The Editorial Board is composed of Academic Editors, who are active scientists working in different fields of the molecular biosciences.

In accordance with the Editor in Chief, the staff at the Editorial Office evaluates all submissions based on editorial policy and general scientific criteria. Manuscripts that pass through the pre-screening process are distributed to appropriate Academic Editors. The Academic Editors evaluate the manuscripts, supervise the peer-review process and make final decisions autonomously. The handling time from submission to first decision is on average 2.3 weeks. Manuscripts accepted for publication are processed by Wiley and published online, bundled in 24 issues per year.

FEBS Letters follows a typical scientific society publishing model, where the income generated by the journal is used by FEBS to fund its activities, i.e. FEBS fellowships, advanced courses and workshops, congresses, and travel grants.

Special Issues
Special Issues are collections of topical Review articles written by distinguished scientists covering the latest developments on specific topics in the molecular biosciences. Special Issue articles are commissioned, but, nevertheless, undergo the usual evaluation procedure exerted by the journal. Every year a Special Issue is directly associated with the FEBS Congress and consists of a compilation of Review articles contributed by speakers presenting their work at the congress.

Access
All accepted articles are published online by Wiley on behalf of FEBS. The FEBS Letters archive is completely digitalized and available back to the first issue in 1968. FEBS Letters follows a subscription-based model with a delayed and hybrid open access policy. All articles are made available to non-subscribers for free after 12 months, with Review articles  being available for free immediately.

FEBS Letters Award
Every other year FEBS Letters offers a prestigious prize of €10,000 to the senior author of an outstanding Research Letter published in FEBS Letters during the previous two calendar years. The winning article is selected in an unbiased fashion by a special Award Committee formed by appointed members of the Editorial Board plus one external member. The awardee is invited to give a plenary lecture at the FEBS Congress, where she/he is presented with the award. The award has been presented regularly since 2003.

Winners

Abstracting and indexing
The journal is indexed in:

References

External links
 Journal homepage

Molecular and cellular biology journals
Biochemistry journals
Wiley (publisher) academic journals
Semi-monthly journals
English-language journals
Publications established in 1968
Delayed open access journals
Hybrid open access journals
Academic journals associated with learned and professional societies